Shersby is a surname. Notable people with the surname include:

 Edwin George Shersby, Sheriff of Canterbury in 1960
 Michael Shersby (1933–1997), British politician

See also
Shearsby, a village in Leicestershire, England

English-language surnames